Claudius B. Claiborne is an American professor and former basketball player. He is known for being the first African-American to play on the Duke Blue Devils men's basketball team.

Claiborne is originally from Danville, Virginia, where he attended John Langston High School. During his senior year in 1965, he was class president as well as captain of the baseball and basketball teams. He matriculated to Duke University on a presidential scholarship in 1965, two years after the first black students integrated at Duke. After a year on the freshman basketball team (NCAA rules prohibited freshmen on varsity teams at the time), he joined varsity men's basketball team for the 1966–67 season. He made his first start in a January 1967 victory over Penn State, after head coach Vic Bubas suspended nine of his players. In 1969, he played in a triple-overtime win against Duke's biggest rival, North Carolina.

Claiborne ultimately graduated in 1969 with a degree in engineering. He later earned further postgraduate degrees from Dartmouth College, Washington University in St. Louis, and Virginia Tech, and became a professor in the business school of Texas Southern.

References

Further reading

External links 
 
 College stats at Sports Reference
 

Living people
People from Danville, Virginia
Duke Blue Devils men's basketball players
Texas Southern University faculty
African-American basketball players
Basketball players from Virginia
Year of birth missing (living people)
21st-century African-American people
Dartmouth College alumni
Washington University in St. Louis alumni
Virginia Tech alumni